Eskett is a hamlet in Cumbria, England. Geologically it is known for its limestone formation.

References

External links
 Cumbria County History Trust: Salter and Eskett (nb: provisional research only – see Talk page)

Hamlets in Cumbria
Borough of Copeland